Christopher "Chris" Gainor is a historian of technology specializing in space exploration and aeronautics.  He has written six books on the history of space exploration and on the Avro Canada CF-105 Arrow, a jet interceptor aircraft canceled by the Canadian government in 1959.

Gainor has most recently completed a history of Hubble Space Telescope operations for the National Aeronautics and Space Administration.

Gainor has been editor of Quest: The History of Spaceflight Quarterly since 2016. He served as president of the Royal Astronomical Society of Canada from 2018 to 2020, and he is a fellow of the British Interplanetary Society.

Gainor holds a Ph.D. in the history of technology from the University of Alberta, and has worked as a history instructor in the University of Victoria's history department and as an Assistant Professor for the Royal Military College of Canada.

Earlier in his career, Gainor worked as a reporter for the Vancouver Sun, where he won a National Newspaper Award  for a series on Canadian cancer activist Terry Fox. He also has worked and written for several other publications, and worked for governmental and non-governmental organizations.

His first book, Arrows to the Moon, tells the story of the 32 British and Canadian aerospace engineers who went to work for the National Aeronautics and Space Administration in 1959 after losing their jobs when the Canadian government cancelled the Avro Arrow. Many of these engineers went on to hold top positions in NASA, including Jim Chamberlin, John Hodge, Owen Maynard, and Tecwyn Roberts. He returned to the history of the Avro Arrow with his book Who Killed the Avro Arrow?

Gainor has also written on the history of missile and space programs in the first years after World War II, including his book To A Distant Day: The Rocket Pioneers and The Bomb and America's Missile Age, which discusses how the U.S. Air Force decided to build its first intercontinental ballistic missile, the Atlas missile. He has also written about the history of the Canadian space program, including his book Canada in Space.

Publications

 Arrows to the Moon: Avro's Engineers and the Space Race (2001) Apogee Books
 Canada in Space: The People & Stories Behind Canada's Role in the Exploration of Space (2006) Folklore Publishing
 Who killed the Avro Arrow? (2007) Folklore Publishing
 To a Distant Day: The Rocket Pioneers (2008) University of Nebraska Press 
 The Bomb and America's Missile Age (2018) Johns Hopkins University Press 
 Not Yet Imagined: A Study of Hubble Space Telescope Operations (2020) NASA History Division

References

Historians of science
21st-century Canadian historians
Canadian male non-fiction writers
Academic staff of the University of Victoria
Year of birth missing (living people)
Living people
Place of birth missing (living people)